Continuum is a compilation album by Mentallo & The Fixer, released on November 14, 1995 by Metropolis Records.

Music
Continuum comprises remastered tracks and remixes from Mentallo & The Fixer's recording sessions circa 1990 to 1993. The collection also draws from the band's first two releases, 1991's Wreckage + Ruin + & + Regrets + (Redemption) and 1992's No Rest for the Wicked.

On February 16, 2018 the album was issued as a music download by Alfa Matrix on the label's Bandcamp.

Reception
Sonic Boom was somewhat positive towards Continuum, calling the album "more of a greatest hits & misses compilation released so that the fans might have an idea of where the band has come from musically" and that "some tracks have the distinct MATF feel to them and others are quite unlike anything else they have ever written before."

Track listing

Personnel
Adapted from the Continuum liner notes.

Mentallo & The Fixer
 Dwayne Dassing (as The Fixer) – programming, mastering
 Gary Dassing (as Mentallo) – vocals, programming

Production and design
 Ric Laciak – design
 Chris Spoonts – mastering

Release history

References

External links 
 
 Continuum at Bandcamp
 Continuum at iTunes

1995 compilation albums
Mentallo & The Fixer albums
Alfa Matrix compilation albums
Metropolis Records compilation albums
Off Beat (label) compilation albums